The bird family Charadriidae includes the plovers, dotterels, and lapwings, about 64 to 68 species in all.

Taxonomy 
The family Charadriidae was introduced (as Charadriadæ) by the English zoologist William Elford Leach in a guide to the contents of the British Museum published in 1820. Most members of the family are known as plovers, lapwings or dotterels. These were rather vague terms which were not applied with any great consistency in the past. In general, larger species have often been called lapwings, smaller species plovers or dotterels and there are in fact two clear taxonomic sub-groups: most lapwings belong to the subfamily Vanellinae, most plovers and dotterels to Charadriinae.

The trend in recent years has been to rationalise the common names of the Charadriidae. For example, the large and very common Australian bird traditionally known as the ‘spur-winged plover’, is now the masked lapwing; the former ‘sociable plover’ is now the sociable lapwing.

Description
They are small to medium-sized birds with compact bodies, short, thick necks and long, usually pointed, wings, but most species of lapwing may have more rounded wings. Their bill are usually straight (except for the wrybill) and short, their toes are short, hind toe could be reduced or absent, depending on species. Most Charadriidae also have relatively short tails, with the exception of the killdeer. In most genera, the sexes are similar, very little sexual dimorphism occurs between sexes.

Distribution and habitat
They are distributed through open country worldwide, mostly in habitats near water, although there are some exceptions: the inland dotterel, for example, prefers stony ground in the deserts of central and western Australia, and the killdeer is often found in grasslands in North America.

Behaviour and ecology
They hunt by sight, rather than by feel as longer-billed waders like snipe do. Foods eaten include aquatic and terrestrial invertebrates such as insects, worms, molluscs and crustaceans depending on habitat, and are usually obtained by a run-and-pause technique, rather than the steady probing of some other wader groups. They also feed on plant material.

Breeding
Vast majority of Charadriidae have a socially monogamous mating system. Some, such as Northern lapwings, are polygynyous, others, such as mountain plovers have a rapid multiple-clutch system that can be accompanied by sequential polyandry. In Eurasian dotterels, females compete for males and males provide all parental care.  While breeding, they defend their territories with highly visible aerial displays.

Charadridae lay two to four eggs into the nest, which is usually a  shallow scrape in the open ground, and incubate the clutch for 21–30 days. In species where both parents incubate the eggs, females and males vary in the way they share their incubation duties, both within and between species. In some pairs, parents exchange on the nest in the morning and in the evening so that their incubation rhythm follows 24-hour day, in others females and males exchange up to 20 times a day.

Charadriidae are protective over their eggs and offspring. The parents protect their young by uttering an alarm call, performing distraction display and they may even attack the predator or intruder. The chicks are precocial; their parents do not feed them.

References

External links

Charadriidae videos on the Internet Bird Collection
Incubating Charadriidae videos in Incubating shorebirds

 
Bird families